The Menu is a 2022 American comedy horror film directed by Mark Mylod, written by Seth Reiss and Will Tracy, based on an original story created by Tracy, produced by Adam McKay, Betsy Koch and Will Ferrell, and starring Ralph Fiennes as a celebrity chef with Hong Chau playing his assistant and Anya Taylor-Joy, Nicholas Hoult, Janet McTeer, Reed Birney, Judith Light, and John Leguizamo playing diners who attend his exclusive restaurant.

The Menu had its world premiere at the Toronto International Film Festival on September 10, 2022, and was released in the United States on November 18, 2022, by Searchlight Pictures. The film grossed over $79 million worldwide on a budget of $30 million and received positive reviews from critics.

Plot
Foodie Tyler Ledford and his date, Margot Mills, travel by boat to Hawthorn, an exclusive restaurant owned and operated by celebrity chef Julian Slowik, located on a private island. The other guests attending the dinner are Lillian Bloom, a food critic; her editor Ted; wealthy regulars Richard and Anne Leibrandt; washed-up movie star George Diaz and his personal assistant Felicity Lynn; business partners Soren, Dave, and Bryce; and Slowik's alcoholic mother Linda. The group is given a tour of the island by the restaurant maître d'hôtel, Elsa, who notes that Margot was not Tyler's designated guest for the evening.

Dinner begins, and Chef Slowik introduces a series of courses, delivering increasingly unsettling monologues about each dish. For the third course, uncomfortable truths about each guest ranging from affairs to embezzlement are exposed via laser-printed images on tortillas. During the fourth course, sous-chef Jeremy kills himself, causing panic amongst the guests, except for Tyler. When Richard tries to leave, the staff cut off his ring finger. Hawthorn's angel investor Doug Verrick, to whom Slowik had to relinquish ownership of the restaurant to stay afloat during the COVID-19 pandemic, is then drowned. For the fifth course, which begins with Slowik allowing himself to be stabbed by Katherine, a female employee whom he sexually harassed, the female guests dine with Katherine while the male guests are given the chance to escape the island via a game of cat-and-mouse, but Slowik's staff catch all of them. Katherine reveals that she was the one to suggest that Slowik kill all of the guests and everyone on the island.

Slowik explains that each guest was invited because they either contributed to him losing his passion for his craft or because they make a living off exploiting the work of artisans and workers like him and his team. He announces that everyone present will be dead by the end of the night. Since Margot's presence was unplanned, Slowik privately gives her the choice of dying either with the staff or the guests, and when she hesitates, he chooses the former for her.

Margot is unmasked as an escort who has previously served Richard and whose real name is Erin. Slowik reveals that Tyler was invited to the dinner months in advance and informed that the guests would be killed. Despite this, Tyler was so zealous in his desire to participate in Slowik's craft that he kept it secret and hired Margot to replace his ex-girlfriend for the evening simply because Hawthorn did not offer to seat for parties of one. Slowik invites Tyler to cook then humiliates him in front of everyone by insulting his food.  Slowik whispers in Tyler's ear and Tyler leaves the kitchen, downcast.

Slowik asks Margot to go to the smokehouse and collect a barrel needed for dessert. As she leaves the kitchen, she sees Tyler's body in a closet, after he has hanged himself. En route, Margot sneaks into Slowik's house, only to be attacked by a jealous Elsa, fearful that she would be replaced by Margot. After a scuffle, Margot accidently kills Elsa. After seeing a framed employee of the month award showing Slowik as a young and happy cook at a greasy spoon diner, Margot finds a radio, calls for help and returns to the restaurant with the barrel. A Coast Guard officer named Dale arrives from his boat, but after the guests are convinced they have been saved, he reveals himself to be a line cook in disguise and returns to the kitchen.

As dessert is being prepared, Margot mocks Slowik's dishes and "loveless" cooking and complains that she is still hungry. When Slowik asks what she would like to eat, Margot requests a cheeseburger and fries. Moved by her humble request, Slowik personally does so, finding joy in creating the dish, and after one bite, Margot requests to take it "to go". Slowik and the staff allow her to leave, with Anne silently encouraging her to do so. Margot takes the Coast Guard boat docked nearby and escapes the island.

The dessert is an elevated s'mores dish—the staff cover the floor with crushed graham crackers and adorn the guests with stoles made of marshmallows and hats made of chocolate. Slowik then sets the restaurant ablaze, detonating the barrel and killing the guests, staff, and himself. Safely away from the island, Margot eats her cheeseburger in silence while watching the restaurant burn, using a copy of the menu to wipe her mouth.

Cast

 Ralph Fiennes as Chef Slowik
 Anya Taylor-Joy as Margot
 Nicholas Hoult as Tyler
 Hong Chau as Elsa
 Janet McTeer as Lillian
 Paul Adelstein as Ted
 John Leguizamo as a movie star 
 Aimee Carrero as Felicity
 Reed Birney as Richard
 Judith Light as Anne
 Rob Yang as Bryce
 Arturo Castro as Soren
 Mark St. Cyr as Dave
 Rebecca Koon as Linda
 Peter Grosz as sommelier
 Christina Brucato as Katherine
 Adam Aalderks as Jeremy

Production

Development
Will Tracy dined at Cornelius Sjømatrestaurant, an island restaurant outside Bergen, Norway, during a honeymoon and later suggested a story to Seth Reiss inspired by the experience. Several figures from the world of fine dining were brought on as consultants for the film, including food designer Dominique Crenn, who recreated several dishes from her San Francisco restaurant Atelier Crenn for the fictional restaurant Hawthorn, and second unit director David Gelb, who was brought on to recreate the filmmaking style from his Netflix docuseries Chef's Table.

It was announced in April 2019 that Alexander Payne was attached to direct. In December 2019, the screenplay appeared on the annual Black List, a survey showcasing the most popular films still in development. By May 2020, Searchlight Pictures held the distribution rights, and Payne had left the film due to scheduling conflicts, with Mark Mylod replacing Payne as director.

Casting
In April 2019, it was announced that Emma Stone and Ralph Fiennes would star in The Menu. 

In June 2021, Anya Taylor-Joy entered negotiations and was confirmed in July to replace Stone, who had left due to commitments to other projects; Hong Chau and Nicholas Hoult joined the cast the same month. John Leguizamo, Janet McTeer, Judith Light, Reed Birney, Rob Yang, and Aimee Carrero joined in September. In October, Paul Adelstein, Arturo Castro, Mark St. Cyr, Rebecca Koon and Peter Grosz were confirmed as parts of the ensemble.

Filming and post-production

Filming began on September 3, 2021, in Savannah, Georgia, with cinematographer Peter Deming. and film editor Christopher Tellefsen. Film locations include the Jekyll Island shore.

Colin Stetson composed the musical score, released by Milan Records as The Menu (Original Motion Picture Soundtrack) on November 18, coinciding with the film's release.

Release
The Menu premiered at the Toronto International Film Festival on September 10, 2022, and also made its US premiere at Fantastic Fest that month. It was released November 18, 2022 in the United States in 3,211 theaters, the widest release in Searchlight's history.

The film was released to digital platforms on January 3, 2023, with a Blu-ray and DVD release by Walt Disney Studios Home Entertainment on January 17, 2023.

Reception

Box office 
, The Menu has grossed $38.5 million in the United States and Canada, and $41.1 million in other territories, for a worldwide total of $79.6 million.

In the United States and Canada, The Menu was released alongside She Said. It made $3.6 million on its first day, including $1 million from Wednesday and Thursday night previews. The film went on to debut to $9 million, finishing second behind holdover Black Panther: Wakanda Forever. Over its second weekend, The Menu made $5.5 million (and a total of $7.6 million over the five-day Thanksgiving frame), finishing fifth. During its third weekend, the film made $3.5 million, finishing fourth.

Critical response

Accolades

References

External links
 
 
 
 Official screenplay

2022 black comedy films
2022 comedy horror films
2022 thriller films
2020s English-language films
2020s American films
American black comedy films
American comedy horror films
American comedy thriller films
Matricide in fiction
Films about chefs
Films directed by Mark Mylod
Films produced by Adam McKay
Films about food and drink
Films about mass murder
Murder–suicide in films
Films set in restaurants
Films set on islands
Films shot in Savannah, Georgia
Films scored by Colin Stetson
Gary Sanchez Productions films
Searchlight Pictures films
TSG Entertainment films